Pawtucket Falls is a waterfall on the Blackstone River in Pawtucket, Rhode Island. The falls are located a half mile upstream from where the Blackstone flows into the Seekonk River. The falls provided power for Samuel Slater’s cotton spinning mill, which was built in 1793 and is said to have been responsible for starting the Industrial Revolution in America.

Etymology 
Pawtucket is an Algonkian word meaning "at the falls in the river (tidal stream)".

See also 
 List of place names of Native American origin in New England

References

External links 

 Providence Journal video of the Blackstone River
 Pawtucket Falls description from slatermill.org

Waterfalls of Rhode Island
Pawtucket, Rhode Island
Landforms of Providence County, Rhode Island